Thomas Larsen may refer to:

 Thomas Larsen (tennis) (born 1975), Danish tennis player
 Thomas Larsen (rower, born 1968), Danish rower
 Thomas Larsen (rower, born 1980), Danish rower
 Thomas Bo Larsen (born 1963), Danish film actor
 Thomas Larsen (bowler) (born 1985), Danish ten-pin bowler
 Thomas Larsen (footballer)